The 34th edition of the World Allround Speed Skating Championships for Women took place on 24 and 25 February in Strömsund at the Strömsvallen Strömsund ice rink.

Title holder was the Netherlander Atje Keulen-Deelstra.

Distance medalists

Classification

 * = Fall

Source:

Attribution
In Dutch

References

1973 World Women's Allround
1973 in women's speed skating
1973 in Swedish sport
International speed skating competitions hosted by Sweden
February 1973 sports events in Europe
1973 in Swedish women's sport